Amarbir Singh Lehal (born 6 March 1981) is an Indian professional golfer.

Lehal has a successful amateur career which included runner-up finishes in several prestigious tournaments, such as the All-India Amateur. He turned professional in 2005 and competes on the Professional Golf Tour of India, which has allowed him to play in several Asian Tour events. His best finish in an Asian Tour co-sanctioned tournament was tied for 34th place in the 2005 Hero Honda Indian Open.

Team appearances
Amateur
Eisenhower Trophy (representing India): 2004
Nomura Cup: 2003

References

External links
Profile on the PGTI's official site

Indian male golfers
Golfers from Chhattisgarh
1981 births
Living people